James May (born 1963) is an English television presenter and journalist.

James or Jim May may also refer to:

Sir James May, 1st Baronet (1723–1811), Anglo-Irish politician 
James May (body snatcher), British member of London Burkers
James May (gymnast) (born 1968), British Olympic gymnast
James May (footballer) (1877–?), Scottish footballer
James Vance May (1873–1947), American psychiatrist
Jim May (Australian footballer) (1910–1979), Australian rules footballer
Jim May (chemical engineer) (born 1934), Australian chemical engineer and business executive 
Jim May (soccer) (born 1953), American soccer goalkeeper
Jim May (tennis) (born 1981), British tennis player

See also
James Disney-May (born 1992), swimmer
James Mays (disambiguation)